Valencia Club de Fútbol "C", shortened to Valencia C, was the second reserve team of Valencia CF, behind Valencia CF Mestalla. It was a Spanish football club based in Valencia, in the namesake community.

History
Founded in 1980 as Gimnástico Club de Fútbol, an honour to dissolved Gimnástico FC, the club played their first two seasons in the Tercera Regional, the lowest category of the regional leagues. After achieving promotion to the Segunda Regional, president Rafa Salom bought a place of another club in the Primera Regional, and the club subsequently played in that division before achieving promotion to the Regional Preferente in 1992.

Gimnástico achieved promotion to Tercera División in 1994. In 2002, the club was sold to Valencia CF, being renamed into Valencia CF C and becoming their second reserve team, behind Valencia CF Mestalla.

In 2004, after Mestalla was relegated to the fourth division, Valencia C ceased activities.

Season-by-season

As Gimnástico CF

As Valencia CF C

10 seasons in Tercera División

References

Valencia CF
Defunct football clubs in the Valencian Community
Association football clubs established in 1980
1980 establishments in Spain
Association football clubs disestablished in 2004
2004 disestablishments in Spain
Spanish reserve football teams